Aesthetic Surgery Journal  is a peer-reviewed medical journal that covers the field of plastic surgery. The journal's editor-in-chief is Foad Nahai (Emory University School of Medicine). It was established in 1996 as Aesthetic Surgery Quarterly and is currently published by Oxford University Press on behalf of the American Society for Aesthetic Plastic Surgery (ASAPS). Aesthetic Surgery Journal was indexed with MEDLINE/PubMed in 2008 and with the Thomson Reuters’ Journal Citation Reports (JCR; formerly ISI) in 2011. Aesthetic Surgery Journal’s current impact factor is 4.283. In the 2014 JCR, Aesthetic Surgery Journal ranked 82nd out of 198 journals in the overall “Surgery” category.

Aesthetic Surgery Journal is the offered at a discount to members of ASAPS-affiliated plastic and aesthetic surgery organizations in other languages:
 Argentine Society of Plastic, Aesthetic, and Reconstructive Surgery
 Brazilian Society of Plastic Surgery
 Colombian Society of Plastic, Aesthetic, Maxillofacial, and Hand Surgery
 Costa Rican Association of Plastic, Reconstructive, and Aesthetic Surgery
 Dutch Society for Aesthetic Plastic Surgery
 Hellenic Society of Plastic, Reconstructive, and Aesthetic Surgery
 Indian Association of Aesthetic Plastic Surgeons
 Israel Society of Plastic and Aesthetic Surgery
 Italian Association for Aesthetic Plastic Surgery
 Japan Society of Aesthetic Plastic Surgery
 Korean Society for Aesthetic Plastic Surgery
 Mexican Association of Plastic, Aesthetic, and Reconstructive Surgery
 Panamanian Association of Plastic, Aesthetic, and Reconstructive Surgery
 Society of Aesthetic Plastic Surgeons of Thailand
 Society of Plastic and Reconstructive Surgeons of Thailand
 Turkish Society of Aesthetic Plastic Surgeons

In addition to ASAPS, Aesthetic Surgery Journal is discounted to members of the English-language organizations listed below.
 British Association of Aesthetic Plastic Surgeons/National Institute of Aesthetic Research
 Canadian Society for Aesthetic Plastic Surgery
 The Rhinoplasty Society

History 
Aesthetic Surgery Journal evolved from an earlier publication that focused primarily on association news for the plastic surgeon membership of ASAPS and gradually grew to incorporate articles of clinical interest in aesthetic surgery. From 1988 through 1994, this newsletter was published three times per year and called Aesthetic Surgery. Beginning in 1995, with an additional issue per year, the name was changed to Aesthetic Surgery Quarterly. It was not until 1996, when ASAPS entered into a publishing agreement with Mosby, that a significant portion of this periodical was designated as the "Clinical Journal" devoted to peer-reviewed original articles. Beginning in January 1997, publication was increased to six issues per year, and the name was changed to Aesthetic Surgery Journal.

The following persons have been editors-in-chief (since 1997, when the publication became Aesthetic Surgery Journal):
 Robert W. Bernard (founding editor, 1997)
 Stanley A. Klatsky (1998-2008)
 Foad Nahai (2009–present)

Abstracting and indexing 
Aesthetic Surgery Journal is abstracted and indexed in:
 Academic OneFile
 Chemical Abstracts
 CINAHL Plus
 Current Contents/Clinical Medicine
 MEDLINE/PubMed
 Science Citation Index
 Scopus

External links 
 

Oxford University Press academic journals
English-language journals
Surgery journals
Publications established in 1996
8 times per year journals